Malcolm in the Middle is an American television sitcom that aired on Fox from January 9, 2000 to May 14, 2006.

Series overview

Episodes

Season 1 (2000)

Season 2 (2000–01)

Season 3 (2001–02)

Season 4 (2002–03)

Season 5 (2003–04)

Season 6 (2004–05)

Season 7 (2005–06)

References

Lists of American sitcom episodes
Lists of American teen comedy television series episodes
 
it:Malcolm (serie televisiva)#Episodi